Uch Tappeh (also Romanized as Ūch Tappeh) is a village in Gonbar Rural District, in the Central District of Osku County, East Azerbaijan Province, Iran. At the 2006 census, its population was 70, in 17 families.

References 

Populated places in Osku County